Frank S. Royal (born c. 1940) is an American physician, company director and civic leader. He is the former chairman and president of the National Medical Association, an African-American medical organization.

Early life
Royal was born circa 1940. He graduated from Virginia Union University in 1961, and he earned an MD from the Meharry Medical College in 1968.

Career
Royal has practised medicine in Richmond, Virginia since 1969. According to the Nashville Post, "Royal also served as chief of staff at Richmond Community Hospital and as an assistant clinical professor of family practice at the Medical College of Virginia." He is the former president and chairman of the National Medical Association, an African-American medical association.

Royal served on the boards of directors of CSX Corporation from 1994 to 2008, SunTrust Banks from 1998 to April 2012, Smithfield Foods from 2002 to 2013. He was also a director of the Hospital Corporation of America.

Civic activities
Royal served as the chairman of the board of trustees of Virginia Union University for three decades, and he was the chair of Meharry Medical College until 2017. He has served on the board of the Robert Russa Moton Museum.

Personal life
Royal has a wife, Pamela.

References

Living people
1940s births
People from Richmond, Virginia
Virginia Union University alumni
Meharry Medical College alumni
African-American physicians
American corporate directors
HCA Healthcare people
SunTrust Banks people